Phantom's Revenge is a steel hypercoaster located at Kennywood amusement park in West Mifflin, Pennsylvania, United States. It originally opened as Steel Phantom in 1991, featuring the fastest speed and longest drop of any roller coaster in the world. Its second drop is longer than its first, which is a unique characteristic among roller coasters. Manufactured by Arrow Dynamics, the ride was later modified and renovated by D.H. Morgan Manufacturing for the 2001 season when it reopened as Phantom's Revenge. The drop and track length were both increased, and its four inversions were removed, allowing the removal of its uncomfortable over-the-shoulder restraints.
 
The ride has consistently ranked among the top 50 steel roller coasters in the world in the annual Golden Ticket Awards publication from Amusement Today, occasionally ranking in the top 10. Additionally, it has frequently ranked in the top 5 of the National Amusement Park Historical Association's annual steel coaster survey.

History
In the late 1980s, president of Kennywood Entertainment Company, Harry Henniger, sought to enter the "coaster arms race" of the time with the addition of a large steel coaster to the park. Faced with the challenge of finding the necessary space, the park settled on a design from Arrow Dynamics. The concept featured a  lift hill with a record-breaking  drop, surpassing the previous  record set two years earlier by Magnum XL-200 at Cedar Point. Kennywood unveiled plans for the new ride, dubbed Steel Phantom, on July 27, 1990. Steel Phantom was built on the former site of Laser Loop, a Shuttle Loop coaster removed after the 1990 season. It also reused the Laser Loop's loading station.

Construction of Steel Phantom began during Labor Day weekend in early September 1990. It was set to open on May 4, 1991, but this would be delayed. The ride opened on May 10, 1991, setting new records in drop height and speed, as well as featuring four inversions. While the coaster was well-received and ranked frequently in the top 10 according to Kennywood, riders often complained of neck strain and excessive headbanging. Shortly after its debut, engineers found that the train would reach speeds exceeding specifications. The ride was closed for over a week so trim brakes could be installed prior to the inversions where the injuries were occurring.

On March 5, 2000, Kennywood announced that they would dismantle Steel Phantom. A replacement for Steel Phantom was not announced at the time. "Just about anything is on the table" said Kennywood spokeswoman, Mary Lou Rosemeyer. After the decision to remove Steel Phantom was announced, the park started receiving complaints and emails about the decision. Kennywood ultimately decided to keep the roller coaster but make modifications to it. On August 10, 2000, Kennywood announced that Steel Phantom would be transformed into Phantom's Revenge for the 2001 season. After the ride closed on Labor Day weekend in 2000, Steel Phantom underwent extensive changes by D. H. Morgan Manufacturing, most notably the removal of all of its inversions. The modified coaster reopened as Phantom's Revenge on May 19, 2001. The coaster only operated with one train in its first season. In 2002, magnetic brakes were added to the ride so a second train could be used. Because of the modifications, both Morgan style and Arrow style track have been utilized. A short theme tune used in television commercials for the attraction was composed by Jim DiSpirito, former member of Pittsburgh-based rock band Rusted Root.

Kennywood hosted an online poll in September 2021, asking fans to decide whether Phantom's Revenge should be repainted teal or purple. Nearly 10,000 people participated in the poll, voting to repaint the track purple. The repainting started in October 2021.

Ride experience 

The terrain coaster layout is built to take advantage of the natural elevation changes provided by the hilly terrain. Unlike most roller coasters, the ride's second drop is longer than its first, and the transformation to Phantom's Revenge in 2001 increased the drop length, track length, and top speed.

Layout

Steel Phantom (1991–2000) 
After leaving the station, the train made a slight turn to the right, climbing the  chain lift hill. After ascending the lift hill, the ride went down a banked drop to the right. After a straight section, the ride went up a second hill that turned slightly to the right. The train made a U-turn to the left at the bottom of the ravine, before climbing another incline into a set of trim brakes before heading into a vertical loop. After the loop, the train immediately went into a boomerang, an element that turned riders upside down twice. The train then made a right turn into a corkscrew, the fourth and final inversion. After this, riders went through a right turn that passed under the corkscrew. After this, the ride ascended into the brake run. One cycle of the ride took approximately 2 minutes and 15 seconds.

Phantom's Revenge (2001–present) 
After leaving the station, the train makes a slight turn to the right before climbing the  chain lift hill. The train then makes a 280-degree turn, passing back under the Thunderbolt's structure. Next, the train circles around the Turtle ride before traveling back under the second drop through a bunny-hop. Riders then make a turn to the left, passing under the ride's brake run and entering a second bunny-hop. The train then enters a 180 degree curve, going through the last bunny-hop and entering the brake run. One cycle of the ride takes approximately 1 minute and 57 seconds.

According to early plans, the ride was originally supposed to feature a double-up element instead of the straightaway between the first and second drops, as well as a longer tunnel after the turnaround.

Trains

As Steel Phantom, the ride had two trains; one painted purple with yellow stripes, and one yellow with purple stripes. Each train had "Kennywood" painted on the front car. Both trains had seven cars that seat two riders in two rows for a total of 28 riders per train. The trains were the same type used on all other Arrow Dynamics looping coasters.

When the ride was renovated, the trains were also updated. Steel Phantom's chassis, that was built by Arrow remained but Morgan built new, aerodynamic fiberglass bodies. Morgan also replaced the over-shoulder-restraints with lap bars and seatbelts. Like its predecessor, Phantom's Revenge operates with two seven-car, 28 passenger trains; one teal and one purple. Originally, each train had both colors with the top half of the train being one color and the bottom half being the other. The front car of each train had "Kennywood" painted on it in white. In 2014, the trains received new bodies identical to the old ones, except each train was now colored solid teal or solid purple with the ride's logo painted on the front cars. A unique lap bar restraint system had to be designed due to the trains using the chassis from Steel Phantom, which were unable to accommodate a traditional floor-mounted lap bar system. Instead, the lap bars on Phantom's Revenge are mounted to the outer side of the seats and lower from beside the rider.

Track
The track was originally manufactured by Arrow Dynamics and painted black with silver/grey rails and grey supports. After the renovation, D.H. Morgan Manufacturing replaced the majority of the track and it was painted green with black supports. Over the years, most of the Arrow Dynamics track has been replaced with Morgan track and the only original Arrow track that remains is the lift hill, the station, and the brake run/transfer track. During the 2021–2022 offseason, the track was repainted purple following a poll.

Comparison

Reception
The original Steel Phantom was largely well-received, but it was criticized for its roughness, mainly due to its speed through the inversions and its  unpopular over-the-shoulder restraints. Following its 2001 conversion, Phantom's Revenge received near-universal acclaim, being praised for its airtime moments, improved ride experience, and for maintaining the thrilling portions from its predecessor. The original restraints were replaced with lap bar restraints for the conversion.

Awards and rankings

Notes

References

External links

 
Phantom's Revenge Article and Photos on Ultimate Rollercoaster.com
America Coasters review of Phantom's Revenge

Kennywood
Roller coasters manufactured by Arrow Dynamics
2001 establishments in Pennsylvania
Hypercoasters
Terrain roller coasters
Roller coasters in Pennsylvania
Steel roller coasters